In mathematics, a Cullen number is a member of the integer sequence  (where  is a natural number). Cullen numbers were first studied by James Cullen in 1905. The numbers are special cases of Proth numbers.

Properties 
In that sense, almost all Cullen numbers are composite. Hooley's proof was reworked by Hiromi Suyama to show that it works for any sequence of numbers n·2n + a + b where a and b are integers, and in particular also for Woodall numbers. The only known Cullen primes are those for n equal to:
 1, 141, 4713, 5795, 6611, 18496, 32292, 32469, 59656, 90825, 262419, 361275, 481899, 1354828, 6328548, 6679881 .

Still, it is conjectured that there are infinitely many Cullen primes.

A Cullen number Cn is divisible by p = 2n − 1 if p is a prime number of the form 8k − 3; furthermore, it follows from Fermat's little theorem that if p is an odd prime, then p divides Cm(k) for each m(k) = (2k − k) 
 (p − 1) − k (for k > 0). It has also been shown that the prime number p divides C(p + 1)/2 when the Jacobi symbol (2 | p) is −1, and that p divides C(3p − 1)/2 when the Jacobi symbol (2 | p) is + 1.

It is unknown whether there exists a prime number p such that Cp is also prime.

Cp follows the recurrence relation
.

Generalizations 

Sometimes, a generalized Cullen number base b is defined to be a number of the form n·bn + 1, where n + 2 > b; if a prime can be written in this form, it is then called a generalized Cullen prime. Woodall numbers are sometimes called Cullen numbers of the second kind.

As of October 2021, the largest known generalized Cullen prime is 2525532·732525532 + 1. It has 4,705,888 digits and was discovered by Tom Greer, a PrimeGrid participant.

According to Fermat's little theorem, if there is a prime p such that n is divisible by p − 1 and n + 1 is divisible by p (especially, when n = p − 1) and p does not divide b, then bn must be congruent to 1 mod p (since bn is a power of bp − 1 and bp − 1 is congruent to 1 mod p). Thus, n·bn + 1 is divisible by p, so it is not prime. For example, if some n congruent to 2 mod 6 (i.e. 2, 8, 14, 20, 26, 32, ...), n·bn + 1 is prime, then b must be divisible by 3 (except b = 1).

The least n such that n·bn + 1 is prime (with question marks if this term is currently unknown) are
1, 1, 2, 1, 1242, 1, 34, 5, 2, 1, 10, 1, ?, 3, 8, 1, 19650, 1, 6460, 3, 2, 1, 4330, 2, 2805222, 117, 2, 1, ?, 1, 82960, 5, 2, 25, 304, 1, 36, 3, 368, 1, 1806676, 1, 390, 53, 2, 1, ?, 3, ?, 9665, 62, 1, 1341174, 3, ?, 1072, 234, 1, 220, 1, 142, 1295, 8, 3, 16990, 1, 474, 129897, ?, 1, 13948, 1, ?, 3, 2, 1161, 12198, 1, 682156, 5, 350, 1, 1242, 26, 186, 3, 2, 1, 298, 14, 101670, 9, 2, 775, 202, 1, 1374, 63, 2, 1, ...

References

Further reading 
 .
 .
 .
 .

External links 
 Chris Caldwell, The Top Twenty: Cullen primes at The Prime Pages.
 The Prime Glossary: Cullen number at The Prime Pages.
 Chris Caldwell, The Top Twenty: Generalized Cullen at The Prime Pages.
 
 Cullen prime: definition and status (outdated), Cullen Prime Search is now hosted at PrimeGrid
 Paul Leyland, (Generalized) Cullen and Woodall Numbers

Integer sequences
Unsolved problems in number theory
Classes of prime numbers